Terellia deserta is a species of tephritid or fruit flies in the genus Terellia of the family Tephritidae.

Distribution
Turkmenistan.

References

Tephritinae
Insects described in 1985
Diptera of Asia